Krępa Słupska  (German Krampe) is a village in the administrative district of Gmina Słupsk, within Słupsk County, Pomeranian Voivodeship, in northern Poland.
 For the history of the region, see History of Pomerania.

The village has a population of 3,000.

References

Villages in Słupsk County